The American Jewish Committee (AJC) is a Jewish advocacy group established on November 11, 1906. It is one of the oldest Jewish advocacy organizations and, according to The New York Times, is "widely regarded as the dean of American Jewish organizations". As of 2009, AJC envisions itself as the "Global Center for Jewish and Israel Advocacy".

Besides working in favor of civil liberties for Jews, the organization has a history of fighting against all forms of discrimination in the United States and working on behalf of social equality, such as filing an amicus brief in the May 1954 case of Brown v. Board of Education and participating in other events in the Civil Rights Movement.

About
The American Jewish Committee (AJC) is an international advocacy organization whose key area of focus is to promote religious and civil rights for Jews and others.

The organization has 25 regional offices in the United States, 13 overseas offices, and 35 international partnerships with Jewish communal institutions around the world.

AJC's programs and departments include:

Former departments include the American Jewish Year Book, the Belfer Center for American Pluralism, Commentary, the Dorothy and Julius Koppelman Institute for American Jewish-Israeli Relations, the Middle East and International Terrorism Division, the Skirball Institute on American Values, and Thanks to Scandinavia.

History

1900–1929 
On November 11, 1906, 81 Jewish Americans met in the Hotel Savoy in New York City to establish the American Jewish Committee. The group was concerned about pogroms against Jews in the Russian Empire. The official committee statement on the purpose was to "prevent infringement of the civil and religious rights of Jews and to alleviate the consequences of persecution."

In its early years the organization was led by lawyer Louis Marshall, banker Jacob H. Schiff, Judge Mayer Sulzberger, scholar Cyrus Adler, and other well-to-do and politically connected Jews. Later leaders were Judge Joseph M. Proskauer, Jacob Blaustein, and Irving M. Engel. In addition to the central office in New York City, local offices were established around the country.

Starting in 1912, Louis B. Marshall was president of the organization until 1929.

In 1914, AJC helped create the American Jewish Joint Distribution Committee, established to aid Jewish victims of World War I. After the war, Marshall went to Europe and used his influence to have provisions guaranteeing the rights of minorities inserted into the peace treaties.

While president, Marshall is credited with making the AJC a leading voice in the 1920s against immigration restriction. Additionally, he succeeded in stopping Henry Ford from publishing antisemitic literature and distributing it through his car dealerships and forced Ford to apologize publicly.

The 1930s and 1940s 
AJC advocated finding places of refuge for Jewish refugees from Adolf Hitler in the 1930s, but had little success. After World War II broke out in 1939, AJC stressed that the war was for democracy and discouraged emphasis on Hitler's anti-Jewish policies lest a backlash identify it as a "Jewish war" and increase antisemitism in the U.S. When the war ended in 1945, it urged a human rights program upon the United Nations and proved vital in enlisting the support that made possible the human rights provisions in the UN Charter.

The 1950s 
AJC took the position that prejudice was indivisible, and that the rights of Jews in the United States could be best protected by arguing in favor of the equality of all Americans. AJC supported social science research into the causes of and cures for prejudice, and forged alliances with other ethnic, racial and religious groups. The organization's research was cited in the 1954 U.S. Supreme Court decision in Brown v. Board of Education that outlawed segregated schools.

In 1950 AJC President Jacob Blaustein reached an agreement with Israeli Prime Minister David Ben-Gurion stating that the political allegiance of American Jews was solely to their country of residence. By the Six-Day War of 1967 AJC had become a passionate defender of the Jewish state, shedding old inhibitions to espouse the centrality of Jewish peoplehood.

The 1960s and 1970s 
Through direct dialogue with the Catholic Church, AJC played a leading role in paving the way for a significant upturn in Jewish-Christian relations in the years leading up to the Roman Catholic Church's 1965 document Nostra aetate, and in the ensuing years. The American Jewish Committee, along with the Synagogue Council of America, and the American Ethical Union each submitted briefs in Engel v. Vitale urging the US Supreme Court to rule that the public school prayer was unconstitutional.

Before the Six-Day War in 1967, AJC was officially "non-Zionist". It had long been ambivalent about Zionism as possibly opening up Jews to the charge of dual loyalty, but it supported the creation of Israel in 1947–48, after the United States backed the partition of Palestine. It was the first American Jewish organization to open a permanent office in Israel.

In the 1970s AJC spearheaded the fight to pass anti-boycott legislation to counter the Arab League boycott of Israel. In particular, Japan's defection from the boycott was attributed to AJC persuasion. In 1975 AJC became the first Jewish organization to campaign against the UN's "Zionism is Racism" Resolution 3379, when briefly integrated to President's Conference in order to join the touristic boycott against Mexico, after the World Conference on Women, 1975, the event in which Arab countries, the Soviet bloc, and Non-Aligned Movement countries impulsed the initial discussion that resulted in Resolution 3379. Along with other American Jewish organizations, AJC announced the suspension of all their trips to Mexico as an expression of "the wish of some Jews and Jewish organizations to boycott Mexico". They did this is spite of their anti-boycott tradition. Finally, the campaign against Resolution 3379 succeeded in 1991, as it was revoked through Resolution 4686. AJC played a leading role in breaking Israel's diplomatic isolation at the UN by helping it gain acceptance in WEOG (West Europe and Others), one of the UN's five regional groups.

AJC was active in the campaign to gain emigration rights for Jews living in the Soviet Union; in 1964 it was one of the founders of the American Jewish Conference on Soviet Jewry, which in 1971 was superseded by the National Conference on Soviet Jewry.

AJC created Present Tense, a magazine of Jewish Affairs edited by Murray Polner, in 1973.

The 1980s and 1990s 
Founded in 1982, Project Interchange runs seminars in Israel for influential Americans.

In December 1987, AJC's Washington representative, David Harris, organized the Freedom Sunday Rally on behalf of Soviet Jewry. Approximately 250,000 people attended the D.C. rally, which demanded that the Soviet government allow Jewish emigration from the USSR. In 1990, David Harris become executive director. Under his leadership, AJC became increasingly involved in international affairs. Regular meetings with foreign diplomats both in the United States and in their home countries were supplemented each September by what came to be called a “diplomatic marathon,” a series of meetings with high-level representatives of foreign countries who were in New York for the UN General Assembly session. The AJC annual meeting was also moved from New York to Washington, D.C., so that more government officials and foreign diplomats might participate.

In 1998 AJC established a full-time presence in Germany—the first American Jewish organization to do so—opening an office in Berlin.

In 1999 AJC ran an ad campaign in support of the NATO's intervention in Kosovo.

The 2000s 
In 2000, AJC helped establish the Atlanta Jewish Film Festival in Atlanta, Georgia, the largest Jewish film festival in the world.

In 2001 AJC became official partners with the Geneva-based UN Watch.

AJC opened in Brussels the AJC Transatlantic Institute in Brussels in 2004, which according to its mission statement works to promote "transatlantic cooperation for global security, Middle East Peace and human rights." That same year, it opened a Russian Affairs Division to identify and train new leaders in American Jewish public advocacy. Other offices were opened in Paris, Rome, Mumbai, and São Paulo.

In 2005, as part of its continuing efforts to respond to humanitarian crises, the organization contributed US$2.5 million to relief funds and reconstruction projects for the victims of the South Asian tsunami and Hurricane Katrina in the US.

In May 2006, nearly 2,000 people gathered in Washington, D.C., to celebrate the 100th Annual Meeting of the American Jewish Committee. President George W. Bush, U.N. Security-General Kofi Annan, and German Chancellor Angela Merkel attended a reception to honor the committee. These individuals gave credit to the American Jewish Committee for protecting Jewish Security and human rights around the world.

In 2007, Commentary, a magazine published by AJC that focused on political and cultural commentary and analysis of politics and society in the U.S. and the Middle East, separated from AJC and became its own organization. In 2008, AJC stopped publishing the American Jewish Year Book, a highly detailed annual account of the Jewish life in the U.S., Israel and the world.

AJC became increasingly involved in the advocacy of energy independence for the U.S. on the grounds that this would reduce dependence on foreign, especially Arab, oil; boost the American economy; and improve the environment. AJC urged Congress and several presidential administrations to take action toward this goal, and called upon the private sector to be more energy-conscious. It adopted "Green" policies for itself institutionally, and in 2011 earned LEED certification, denoting that its New York headquarters was energy efficient and environmentally sound.

As part of a new strategic plan adopted in 2009, AJC said it envisioned itself as the "Global Center for Jewish and Israel Advocacy" and the "Central 'Jewish Address' for Intergroup Relations and Human Rights." Its new tagline was "Global Jewish Advocacy."

In 2010, AJC renamed their annual conference "Global Forum".

The 2010s  
AJC diplomatic efforts since 2010 include opposition to Iran's program to attain nuclear capability; a campaign to get the European Union to designate Hezbollah a terrorist organization; preserving the right of Jews to practice circumcision in Germany; and urging the government of Greece to take action against the neo-Nazi Golden Dawn party.

Along with other agencies such as the Simon Wiesenthal Center and the Union for Reform Judaism, the AJC condemned a move in mid-2014 by the U.S. Presbyterian Church to divest from companies that do business with Israel settlements. An AJC statement asserted that the divestment is just one incident of the U.S. church group "demonizing Israel", referring to "one-sided reports and study guides, such as 'Zionism Unsettled'" as proof of anti-Zionist sentiments.

In 2016, the AJC and Islamic Society of North America formed the Muslim-Jewish Advisory Council to address rising bigotry against Jews and Muslims in the United States.

On 22 February 2019, AJC condemned the Otzma Yehudit party, calling its views "reprehensible." The AJC statement said Otzma Yehudit's views "do not reflect the core values that are the very foundation of the State of Israel." The AJC statement came after the Bayit Yehudi party merged with Otzma Yehudit and the new joint slate appeared likely to win enough votes to earn seats in the next Knesset as well as ministerial roles for some of its members. No members of Otzma Yehudit were elected.

The 2020s 
In January 2020, AJC and the Muslim World League, a Mecca-based non-governmental organization, led a historic joint delegation of Muslims and Jews to commemorate the 75th anniversary of the liberation of Auschwitz, the Nazi German death and concentration camp. The trip was the most senior Islamic delegation to ever visit Auschwitz. As a part of the visit, David Harris and Dr. Al-Issa, Secretary-General of the Muslim World League, published a joint opinion editorial in the Chicago Tribune on how Auschwitz united Muslims and Jews.

In early 2022, AJC released its fourth annual State of Antisemitism in America report and later that year the organization announced its "Call to Action on Antisemitism" playbook. After a string of high-profile antisemitic incidents, including comments made by Kanye West, the organization participated in a White House round-table on antisemitism with First Gentleman Doug Emhoff.

David Harris announced in 2021 that he would soon retire and did so in 2022 after more than 30 years at the organization. He was replaced by former Florida congressman Ted Deutch, who resigned from the U.S. House of Representatives to take the job.

On February 10, 2023, CEO Ted Deutch joined Emhoff, UN Undersecretary General Melissa Fleming, U.S. Ambassador to the U.N. Linda Thomas-Greenfield, and Ambassador Deborah Lipstadt on a panel about antisemitism.

Controversy and criticism

AJC response during the Holocaust

AJC "worked to contain nativist sentiment in America rather than work to open America’s doors to refugees" during the Holocaust. They were criticized for their lack of reaction and silence during the Holocaust; historian and AJC National Director of Jewish Communal Affairs Steven Bayme said AJC leaders never understood the uniqueness of Nazism and its "war against the Jews."

New antisemitism

A 2007 essay, "Progressive Jewish Thought and the New Anti-Semitism" by Professor Alvin H. Rosenfeld, published on the AJC website, criticized Jewish critics of Israel by name, particularly the editors and contributors to "Wrestling With Zion: Progressive Jewish-American Responses to the Israeli-Palestinian Conflict" (Grove Press), a 2003 collection of essays edited by Tony Kushner and Alisa Solomon. The essay accused these writers of participating in an "onslaught against Zionism and the Jewish State," which he considered a veiled form of supporting a rise in antisemitism.

In an editorial, the Jewish newspaper The Forward called Rosenfeld's essay "a shocking tissue of slander" whose intent was to "turn Jews against liberalism and silence critics." Richard Cohen remarked that the essay "has given license to the most intolerant and narrow-minded of Israel's defenders so that, as the AJC concedes in my case, any veering from orthodoxy is met with censure ... the most powerful of all post-Holocaust condemnations—anti-Semite—is diluted beyond recognition."

The essay was also criticized by Rabbi Michael Lerner and in op-eds in The Guardian and The Boston Globe.

In a Jerusalem Post op-ed, AJC Executive Director David Harris explained why the organization published Rosenfeld's essay in 2007:

Rosenfeld has courageously taken on the threat that arises when a Jewish imprimatur is given to the campaign to challenge Israel's very legitimacy. He has the right to express his views no less than those whom he challenges. It is important to stress that he has not suggested that those about whom he writes are anti-Semitic, though that straw-man argument is being invoked by some as a diversionary tactic. As befits a highly regarded and prolific scholar, he has written a well-documented and thought-provoking essay that deserves to be considered on its merits.

Unity pledge
In October 2011 AJC issued a joint statement with the Anti-Defamation League urging American Jews to support a Joint Unity Pledge stating: "America's friendship with Israel is an emotional, moral and strategic bond that has always transcended politics." It urged that "now is the time to reaffirm that Israel's well-being is best served, as it always has been, by American voices raised together in unshakeable support for our friend and ally."

The statement aroused a storm of protest from Jewish opponents of President Obama's re-election, who perceived it as a call to avoid criticizing the president's policies toward Israel. In the pages of The Wall Street Journal, former Under Secretary of Defense Douglas Feith asked: "Since when have American supporters of Israel believed that a candidate's attitudes toward Israel should be kept out of electoral politics? Since never." David Harris responded that the statement was intended to preserve the tradition of bipartisan support for Israel and prevent it from becoming "a dangerous political football." While Harris recognized the right of anyone in the Jewish community to take a partisan position, he stressed the need for "strong advocacy in both parties" at a time of looming international difficulties for the Jewish state.

Notable people

Presidents
 Mayer Sulzberger (1906–1912), also co-founder
 Louis B. Marshall (1912–1929), also co-founder
 Cyrus Adler (1929–1940), also co-founder
 Sol M. Stroock (1941)
 Maurice Wertheim (1941–1943)
 Joseph M. Proskauer (1943–1949), also co-founder
 Jacob Blaustein (1949–1954)
 Irving M. Engel (1954–1959)
 Herbert B. Ehrmann (1959–1961)
 Frederick F. Greenman (1961)
 Louis Caplan (1961–1962)
 A. M. Sonnabend (1962–1964)
 Morris B. Abram (1964–1968)
 Arthur J. Goldberg (1968–1969)
 Philip E. Hoffman (1969–1973)
 Elmer L. Winter (1973–1977)
 Richard Maass (1977–1980)
 Maynard I. Wishner (1980–1983)
 Howard I. Friedman (1983–1986)
 Theodore Ellenoff (1986–1989)
 Sholom D. Comay (1986–1991)
 Alfred H. Moses (1991–1994)
 Robert S. Rifkind (1995–1998)
 Bruce M. Ramer (1998–2001)
 Harold Tanner (2001–2004)
 E. Robert Goodkind (2004–2007)
 Richard Sideman (2007–2010)
 Robert Elman (2010–2013)
 Stanley M. Bergman (2013–2016)
 John Shapiro (2016–2019)
 Harriet Schleifer (2019–2022)
 Michael L. Tichnor (2022–)

Other key people
Steven Bayme, former Director of Jewish Communal Affairs
Elliot E. Cohen, former Editor-in-Chief of Commentary
Felice D. Gaer, Director of AJC's Jacob Blaustein Institute for the Advancement of Human Rights
Laurie Ann Goldman, former board member
Jerry Goodman, former Director for European Affairs
David Harris, executive director in 1990-2022
Monika Krajewska, recipient of AJC Lifetime Achievement Award
Avital Leibovich, Director of AJC in Israel
Ted Deutch, former member of U.S. House of Representatives and current CEO of AJC
Samuel D. Leidesdorf, former board member and AJC Herbert H. Lehman Human Relations Award recipient
John T. Pawlikowski, AJC Chicago Distinguished Service Award recipient
Norman Podhoretz, former Editor-in-Chief of Commentary
A. James Rudin, former Director of Interreligious Affairs
Jacob H. Schiff, co-founder
Marc H. Tanenbaum, Director of Interreligious Affairs and later Director of International Affairs
Max Horkheimer, German sociologist and Director of AJC whilst emigrated from 1942 until 1949, founded the AJCs Department of Scientific Research

See also

American Jews
American Jewish Congress
American Jewish Anti-Bolshevism during the Russian Revolution

References

Further reading
Barnett, Michael N. 2016. The Star and the Stripes: A History of the Foreign Policies of American Jews. Princeton University Press.
Cohen, Naomi Wiener. "The Transatlantic Connection: The American Jewish Committee and the Joint Foreign Committee in Defense of German Jews, 1933-1937," American Jewish History V. 90, #4, December 2002, pp. 353–384 in Project MUSE.
Cohen, Naomi Wiener. Not Free to Desist: The American Jewish Committee, 1906-1966 (1972), a standard history
Grossman, Lawrence. "Transformation Through Crisis: The American Jewish Committee and the Six-Day War," American Jewish History, Volume 86, Number 1, March 1998, pp. 27–54.
Handlin, Oscar. "The American Jewish Committee: A Half-Century View," Commentary (Jan. 1957), pp. 1–10, online.
Loeffler, James, "The Particularist Pursuit of American Universalism: The American Jewish Committee's 1944 'Declaration on Human Rights,'" Journal of Contemporary History (April 2015) 50, pp. 274–95.
Sanua, Marianne R. Let Us Prove Strong: The American Jewish Committee, 1945-2006 (2007) – the standard scholarly history.
Solomon, Abba A. The Speech, and Its Context: Jacob Blaustein's Speech "The Meaning of Palestine Partition to American Jews" Given to the Baltimore Chapter, American Jewish Committee, February 15, 1948 (2011) – includes full text of speech, and some history of AJC perspective on Palestine and Israel.
Svonkin, Stuart. Jews Against Prejudice: American Jews and the Fight for Civil Liberties (1997) – covers AJC and other groups including the Anti-Defamation League and the American Jewish Congress.

External links

President attends Centennial dinner
American Jewish Committee Archives
American Jewish Committee publications (full text) on the Berman Jewish Policy Archive @ NYU Wagner
Hate Crime Laws vs. Fundamental Freedoms at Atlantic Community think tank

 
Israel–United States relations
United States political action committees
Organizations established in 1906
The Holocaust and the United States
1906 establishments in the United States
Jewish political organizations
Jewish lobbying
Zionist organizations
Zionism in the United States
Civil rights organizations in the United States
Human rights organizations based in the United States